Kenneth Earl Hurlburt (April 10, 1928 – July 17, 2016) was a Canadian Member of Parliament.

Life
Kenneth Earl "The Hurler" Hurlburt was born on April 10, 1928 in Lethbridge, Alberta. He was a Canadian politician, and a member of Parliament in the 1970s. Prior to his political career he worked as an auctioneer, as well as a businessman. After retiring from politics in 1979, he started his own ranch outside of Lethbridge. He died in 2016 at the age of 88.

Political career
Hurlburt was a member of the Progressive Conservative party, and ran in the Lethbridge, Alberta district, where he was elected in both the 1972 and 1974 federal elections. He served as a member of the Progressive Conservative caucus from 1973 to 1979. Hurlburt famously received his nickname, "The Hurler", in 1975 after a particularly animated session of parliament, during which a heated argument erupted between Hurlburt and a fellow representatives . The argument culminated in Hurlburt  picking up his colleague and tossing him to the parliamentary floor. After this event Hurlburt was dubbed 'The Hurler' by the press, and the nickname stuck, with Hurlburt still referred by it to this day.
Mr. Hurlburt was involved in a famous court case (1972–75) as to how he obtained his ranch.

References

 

1928 births
2016 deaths
Members of the House of Commons of Canada from Alberta
People from Lethbridge
Progressive Conservative Party of Canada MPs